Cannibalism is a compilation double album by Krautrock artists Can which was released in 1978.

Track listing

Tracks marked [*] were edited to shorter length from the original tracks.

Side A
 "Father Cannot Yell"  – 7:05
 "Soul Desert"  – 3:30
 "Soup"  – 3:03 [*]
 "Mother Sky"  – 6:41 [*]

Side B
 "She Brings the Rain"  – 4:07
 "Mushroom"  – 4:31
 "One More Night"  – 5:37
 "Spray"  – 2:57 [*]
 "Outside My Door"  – 4:11

Side C
 "Chain Reaction"  – 5:44 [*]
 "Halleluwah"  – 5:39 [*]
 "Aumgn"  – 7:18 [*]
 "Dizzy Dizzy"  – 3:30

Side D
 "Yoo Doo Right"  – 20:20

Notes
The CD release of Cannibalism, which is contained on a single disc, does not contain the tracks "Soul Desert" and "Spray".

References

1980 compilation albums
Can (band) albums
United Artists Records compilation albums